Sofija Korkutytė (22 July 1939 – 23 May 2000) was a Lithuanian rower who won three European titles in the eights event in 1963, 1965 and 1967; she finished second in 1964 and 1966. In 1966 Korkutytė graduated from the Economics Faculty of Vilnius University. From 1964 to 1981 she worked as a rowing coach and between 1981 and 1998 she was employed at the Lithuanian Ministry of Land Reclamation and Water Management. In parallel she also acted as a rowing judge.

References

1939 births
2000 deaths
Lithuanian female rowers
Soviet female rowers
European Rowing Championships medalists